The modem tax is a hoax dating back to the days of bulletin board systems stating the Federal Communications Commission or the United States Congress intends to impose a tax on modem use. The FCC has described it as an urban myth.

References

1980s in the United States
Federal Communications Commission
Hoaxes in the United States
Internet hoaxes
Taxation in the United States